"Sex sells" is a phrase alluding to the use of sex in advertising in order to help sell a particular product or service through sex appeal.

Sex Sells may also refer to:
 Sex Sells: The Making of Touché, 2005 comedy film
 "Sex Sells", 2021 song by Lovejoy from Are You Alright?

See also 
 CexCells, album by Blaqk Audio